The Indonesian Financial Transaction Reports and Analysis Center or INTRAC or PPATK is a government agency of Indonesia, responsible on financial intelligence. The agency is formed in 2002 to counter suspected money laundering and provide information on terrorist financing.

History 
In 1997, Indonesia officially signed and ratified United Nations Convention Against Illicit Traffic in Narcotic Drugs and Psychotropic Substances of 1988. As one of signatory countries, Indonesia obliged to consider money laundering as criminal act and required to have measure to identify, trace, or confiscate money in relation to illicit traffic in narcotics drugs. At the same year, Asia/Pacific Group on Money Laundering is also founded, which Indonesia officially joined in 2000.

The second Financial Action Task Force (FATF) report published in June 2001 and including a supplemental report in September, denoted Indonesia as one of non-cooperative countries. As response, Bank Indonesia issued Bank Indonesia Regulation No. 3/10/PBI/2001 on Know your customer principle, which requires financial institution to identify its customer and its transactional profile, and trace money source. And refer to this regulation, financial transaction reports and analysis is officially conducted by special investigation unit of Bank Indonesia.

On the next year, Law No. 15 year 2002 regarding money laundering issued to further strengthen effort on combatting money laundering and PPATK was officially formed. Since 2010, PPATK is regulated by Law No. 8 year 2010. PPATK's mandate was expanded in 2013 to provide information regarding terrorist financing by Law No. 9 year 2013.

Task and function 
Task and Function of PPATK are as follows:
Prevention of money laundering
Data and information management
Supervision of the compliance of the reporting parties
Analyze or investigation of financial transactions that there are reasonable grounds to suspect are related to the commission of a money laundering offence or other crimes

PPATK is authorized to:

Obtain data and information from government agencies and/or private institution which authorized to manage data and information
Define guidance to identify suspicious transaction
Coordinate with related party to prevent money laundering
Recommend the government to prevent money laundering
Represent the government in international organization or forum related to financial intelligence
Provide training and education in money laundering prevention

Structure

Organization structure 
Based of Presidential Decree No. 10/2022 and Head of PPATK Regulation No. 5/2022, PPATK consisted of:

 Leadership Elements
 Office of the Head of PPATK
 Office of the Vice Head of PPATK
 Main Secretariat
 General Affairs Bureau
 Division of Household Affairs and Equipment
 Sub-division of Procurement Service
 Division of Leadership Administration
 Sub-division of Leadership Protocol and Security
 Sub-division of Leadership Administration
 Planning and Finance Bureau
 Division of Accountancy Verification and Performance Accountability
 Human Resources, Organization, and Administration Bureau
 Division of Organization, Administration, and Risks Management
 Division of Human Resource Development
 Deputy I (Strategy and Partnership)
 Directorate of Domestic Strategy and Partnership
 Directorate of Foreign Strategy and Partnership
 Directorate of Law and Regulations
 Administration Section
 Deputy II (Reporting and Compliance Monitoring)
 Directorate of Financial Service Compliance Monitoring
 Directorate of Goods and/or Other Services and Profession Compliance Monitoring
 Directorate of Reporting
 Administration Section
 Deputy III (Analysis and Investigation)
 Directorate of Analysis and Investigation I (Proactive Analysis and Investigation Related to Corruption, Fiscal Affairs, and Worthiness of State Officials or Other State Strategic Positions Posting)
 Directorate of Analysis and Investigation II (Proactive Analysis and Investigation of Money Laundry Related to Financial Crimes, Narcotics, Environmental Crimes, other Crimes, and Terrorism)
 Directorate of Analysis and Investigation III (Reactive Analysis and Investigation of Money Laundry Activities, Money Laundry related to Predicated Crimes, and Terrorism)
 Administration Section
 General Inspectorate
 Centers
 Center of Information and Technology
 Center of Education and Training for Anti Money Laundering and Terrorism Funding Prevention/Indonesian Financial Intelligence Institute 
 Center of Partnership Strengthening for Anti Money Laundering and Terrorism Funding Prevention

Training 
PPATK possessed a specialized school to train PPATK future operatives, law enforcements, academicians, and experts which interested to anti money laundering and financial intelligence. The school called Center of Education and Training for Anti Money Laundering and Terrorism Funding Prevention or colloquially called as Indonesian Financial Intelligence Institute (but the official abbreviation is IFII instead of IIKI). The school was founded by Kiagus Ahmad Badaruddin (Head of PPATK) in 2017 and inaugurated by Wiranto on behalf of Joko Widodo on 30 November 2017. Unlike the intelligence schools in Indonesia like PoltekSSN (National Cyber and Crypto Agency) or STIN (State Intelligence Agency), IFII does not issue degree.

IFII is the only education institution focusing financial intelligence in Indonesia and also the whole of Southeast Asia. IFII also housing institution of Center for Money Laundering and Predicated Crime Studies, a research institution dedicated for researching policies and strategies formulation and means to combat money laundering and predicated crimes.

References

Government agencies of Indonesia
Finance in Indonesia